Christian Jaan Kaarna (also Christjan Kaarna and Kristjan Kaarna; 20 October 1882 – 1 January 1943) was an Estonian journalist, banker, and politician.

Kaarna was born in Artra, Palupera Parish, Kreis Dorpat (now Elva Parish) to farmers Jaan and Liisa Kaarna (née Tullino). He studied at Kirepi Primary School and Kavilda Parish School. He graduated from the Teachers' Seminary of the University of Tartu. Between 1904 and 1905, he worked in Kodijärve Parish as a parish clerk. In 1905, he worked for the Tartu newspaper Vabadus. In 1906, he worked  for the Tallinn newspapers Sõnumed and Virulane. From 1909 until in 1916, he was the editor of the Narva newspaper Meie Elu. From In 1916 until 1917, he served in the Imperial Russian Army.

Between 1918 and 1920, Kaarna was Commissar of the Estonian Provisional Government in Narva and Virumaa. He was Minister of Labor and Welfare in the years from 1921 until 1923 in Konstantin Päts' first cabinet (from 16 December 1921 until 20 October 1922) and Juhan Kukk's cabinet (21 November 1922 to 2 August 1923), as well the years 1924 to In 1926 in Friedrich Akel's cabinet, in the government of Jüri Jaakson and in the first government of Jaan Teemant. In addition, he was a member of the Riigikogu from 1920 until 1929 in the I, II and III Riigikogu, representing the Estonian Labour Party.

During the period of 1928 until 1940, he was the director of the Bank of Estonia, as well as serving as a board member of several other several banks, such as the National Mortgage Bank of Estonia. He was the chairman of several organizations, such as the Narva Estonian Society, one of the founders and chairman of the Joala Mutual Credit Union, a member of the board of the Estonia Society, and an assistant chairman of the congregation of the Estonian Evangelical Lutheran Church's Kaarli Church on Toompea.

Following the Soviet occupation of Estonia in 1940, Kaarna was arrested by the NKVD on 18 September 1940 and died in imprisonment in the gulag in Karaganda.

References

1882 births
1943 deaths
People from Elva Parish
People from Kreis Dorpat
Estonian Lutherans
Estonian Labour Party politicians
Government ministers of Estonia
Members of the Riigikogu, 1920–1923
Members of the Riigikogu, 1923–1926
Members of the Riigikogu, 1926–1929
Chairmen of the Bank of Estonia
Estonian journalists
Estonian bankers
University of Tartu alumni
Russian military personnel of World War I
Recipients of the Order of the White Star, 2nd Class
Estonian people who died in Soviet detention
People who died in the Gulag